The 2010 Rally México was the 23rd Rally Mexico and the second round of the 2010 World Rally Championship season. The rally took place over March 5–7, and was based in León, in the Guanajuato region of the country. The event was part of the celebrations of the 100th anniversary of the Mexican Revolution and the 200th anniversary of its independence. The rally was also the second round of both the Production Car World Rally Championship and the Super 2000 World Rally Championship.

The stages of the rally mixed mountain peaks with flat open valleys. Due to the high altitude, engines struggle to breathe in the thin air, causing a twenty percent reduction in their output. Stage 20 of the rally — Sauz Seco — was cancelled prior to the event, on safety grounds.

Sébastien Loeb took his 55th career rally victory, leading from the end of the eleventh stage onwards. Loeb won by just over 24 seconds from another Citroën driver, Petter Solberg. Solberg had led the rally throughout the first leg, and only took second position on the final stage through the super special stage. Solberg's gain was Sébastien Ogier's loss, as the Citroën junior driver just missed out on equalling his best career result in the World Rally Championship. Solberg overturned a 0.6-second gap over the final , taking Ogier by 1.1 seconds.

In the SWRC event, Xavier Pons took the victory after battling Martin Prokop throughout the event. In the end, the Spanish driver took victory by just seventeen seconds, as both finished inside the overall top ten, in eighth and ninth places respectively. Prokop moved into the championship lead with a second to go with his third in Sweden. Michał Kościuszko was third, but over half an hour behind Pons and Prokop, with Eyvind Brynildsen and Albert Llovera rounding out the class finishers.

In the PWRC, Armindo Araújo took victory by over three minutes from Toshi Arai. Miguel Baldoni, Benito Guerra and Gianluca Linari were the only other finishers. With Patrik Flodin absent, Araújo moved into a 15-point championship lead.

The rally also ran an event/class named "Rally America" which allowed cars legal in the similarly named but unrelated Rally America series to run on the same stages as the WRC cars. The 2010 event was notable for the participation of amateur driver Bill Caswell who drove a 1991 BMW 318i he bought for $500 over Craigslist alongside co-driver Ben Slocum to 3rd place in the class, much to the amusement of the other drivers.

Results

Event standings

Special stages

Standings after the rally

Drivers' Championship standings

Manufacturers' Championship standings

References

External links 
 Results at official page
 Results at eWRC-results.com

Mexico
Rally Mexico
Rally
March 2010 sports events in Mexico